Haplotrinchus is a genus of beetles in the family Buprestidae, containing the following species:

 Haplotrinchus aurocupreus (Kerremans, 1900)
 Haplotrinchus edai Ohmomo, 2002
 Haplotrinchus embrikiellus Obenberger, 1936
 Haplotrinchus inaequalis (Deyrolle, 1864)
 Haplotrinchus manni Thery, 1937
 Haplotrinchus philippinensis Obenberger, 1928
 Haplotrinchus pooli Thery, 1943
 Haplotrinchus pyrochlorus (Fairmaire, 1877)
 Haplotrinchus semperi Thery, 1943
 Haplotrinchus splendens Waterhouse, 1913
 Haplotrinchus viridis (Deyrolle, 1864)
 Haplotrinchus viridula (Olivier, 1790)

References

Buprestidae genera